Oxycarenidae is a family of true bugs in the order Hemiptera. There are more than 20 genera and 140 described species in Oxycarenidae.

Genera
These 27 genera belong to the family Oxycarenidae:

 Anomaloptera Amyot & Serville, 1843
 Auchenodes Horvath, 1891
 Barberocoris Miller, 1956
 Bethylimorphus Lindberg, 1953
 Bianchiella Reuter, 1907
 Bogdiana Kerzhner, 1964
 Brachyplax Fieber, 1860
 Bycanistellus Reuter, 1890
 Camptotelus Fieber, 1860
 Crophius Stal, 1874
 Dycoderus Uhler, 1901
 Jakowleffia Puton, 1875
 Leptodemus Reuter, 1900
 Macroplax Fieber, 1860
 Macropternella Slater, 1957
 Mayana Distant, 1893
 Metopoplax Fieber, 1860
 Microplax Fieber, 1860
 Neaplax Slater, 1974
 Neocamptotelus Hoberlandt, 1987
 Neocrophius Henry & Dellapé, 2015
 Notocoderus Henry & Dellapé, 2009
 Oxycarenus Fieber, 1837
 Philomyrmex Sahlberg, 1848
 Tropidophlebia Kerzhner, 1964
 Urvaschia Hopp, 1987
 † Procrophius Scudder, 1890

References

Further reading

External links

 

Lygaeoidea
Heteroptera families